Sabri Freddy Khattab (born 12 January 1990) is an footballer who plays as a midfielder for Tistedalens TIF. Born in Norway, he declared himself for the Egypt national team in 2013.

Club career
Sabri signed for FC Edmonton from hometown side Kvik Halden in 2017. He made his debut in a 1–0 loss to Jacksonville Armada, coming on as a substitute for Dean Shiels.

In July 2017, Sabri returned to Norway and signed for Elverum Sabri left Elverum at the end of 2019 and moved back to Halden, where he was born. In May 2020, Khattab moved to Tistedalens TIF. He then had a short spell with Kvik Halden in late 2020, before returning to Tistedalens in 2021.

International career
Although he was born in Norway, Sabri declared himself for the Egypt national team in 2013, however he has yet to be called up.

References

External links
 
 

1990 births
Living people
People from Halden
Egyptian footballers
Norwegian footballers
Norwegian people of Egyptian descent
Association football midfielders
Kvik Halden FK players
Bryne FK players
FC Edmonton players
Norwegian First Division players
North American Soccer League players
Egyptian expatriate footballers
Norwegian expatriate footballers
Norwegian expatriate sportspeople in Canada
Egyptian expatriate sportspeople in Canada
Expatriate soccer players in Canada
Sportspeople from Viken (county)